Russell G. Hamilton (born 1934, in New Haven, Connecticut – died February 27, 2016, in Minnesota) was an American author specialised in history and literature. He was a professor emeritus of Spanish and Portuguese and first African-American to serve as a dean at Vanderbilt University in Nashville, Tennessee. He is the author of Voices from an Empire, a History of Afro-Portuguese Literature which was first published in 1975 and Literatura Africana, Literatura Necessária.

Biography 
Hamilton was born in New Haven, Connecticut, United States and grew up in New England. His father was a chemical operator and his mother operated as a secretary, according to Vanderbilt University, Hamilton told a reporter from a Nashville Banner in 1985 that he wanted to be a professor. He obtained his bachelor's degree from the University of Connecticut, and earned his master's from the University of Wisconsin-Madison, he studied in Brazil for two years before his PhD work completion at Yale University. Prior his graduation, Hamilton was hired as a deputy professor by the University of Minnesota, where he additionally served as a professor and an Associate Dean for Faculty. After his 20-year service at the University of Minnesota, he joined the Vanderbilt Community where he served as Dean of the Graduate School. During his tenure as a dean, the University progressed in conscripting African American doctoral students and upheld them through the accomplishment of their degrees. In 1990s, Hamilton led the university’s Committee for Recruitment and Retention of Minority Faculty. Hamilton also headed the Graduate School as Dean for Graduate Studies and Research from 1984 to 2000. He continued on faculty as a professor of Spanish and Portuguese and was accorded an emeritus status in 2002, before his retirement in 2005. Hamilton also served as a Fulbright research fellow in Portugal and Africa. Nicholas S. Zeppos, former chancellor of Vanderbilt University described him as a true pioneer.

Awards and recognitions 

 Mary Cady Tew Prize for the most promising doctoral student in Romance languages at Yale University.
 The Wilbur Lucius Cross Medal for outstanding graduate alumni of Yale University
 The Louise Williams Educational Service Award

Bibliography

Books 

 
 Literatura Africana, Literatura Necessária
 Tribute to Gerald M. Moser
 Gabriela Meets Olodum: Paradoxes of Hybridity, Racial Identity, and Black Consciousness in Contemporary Brazil
 Conceição Lima, Poet of São Tomé e Príncipe
 Contemporary Cape Verdean Literature
 A History of Postcolonial Lusophone Africa
 European Transplants, Amerindian In-laws, African Settlers, Brazilian Creoles: A Unique Colonial and Postcolonial Condition in Latin America

References 

1934 births
2016 deaths
American writers
African-American writers
American academic administrators
African-American academics
African-American academic administrators
University of Connecticut alumni
Vanderbilt University
Yale University alumni